Raso da Catarina Ecological Station is a strictly protected ecological station in the state of Bahia in Brazil.
It lies in the Raso da Catarina ecoregion of the Caatinga biome.

Location

It is administered by the Chico Mendes Institute for Biodiversity Conservation.
The reserve is classified as International Union for Conservation of Nature (IUCN) category Ia (strict nature reserve).
The reserve covers parts of the municipalities of Rodelas, Paulo Afonso and Jeremoabo in Bahia.
It is bounded to the south by the  Serra Branca / Raso da Catarina Environmental Protection Area, created in 2001.
It became part of the Caatinga Ecological Corridor, created in May 2006.

Purpose

The purpose is to conserve nature and support scientific research.
Specifically the purpose is to conserve the endemic and/or endangered species Lear's macaw (Anodorhynchus leari), three-banded armadillo (Tolypeutes tricinctus), white-browed guan (Penelope jacucaca), yellow-faced siskin (Spinus yaerrellii), pectoral antwren (Herpsilochmus pectoralis) and cougar (Puma concolor greeni).

Notes

Sources

Ecological stations of Brazil
Protected areas of Bahia
Protected areas established in 2001
2001 establishments in Brazil
Caatinga